Gert Wilden (born Gert Wychodil; 15 April 1917 – 10 September 2015) was a German film composer.  He was born in Mährisch Trübau. From 1956 through his retirement, he scored music for 50 feature films in numerous genres.  However, he is perhaps best known for his music for erotic films in the 1970s, especially the Schoolgirl Report (Schulmädchen Report) series.

Wilden was married to former actress and singer Trude Hofmeister. Wilden died on 10 September 2015, aged 98.

Selected filmography
 Mikosch, the Pride of the Company (1958)
 Ramona (1961)
 Robert and Bertram (1961)
 Café Oriental (1962)
 The Hot Port of Hong Kong (1962)
 Holiday in St. Tropez (1964)
 Black Eagle of Santa Fe (1965)
 Hotel der toten Gäste (1965)
  Come to the Blue Adriatic (1966)
 13 Days to Die (1965)
 Madame and Her Niece (1969)
 The Young Tigers of Hong Kong (1969)
 Schulmädchen-Report (1970)

Notes

References

External links

1917 births
2015 deaths
German film score composers
Male film score composers
German male composers
Moravian-German people
People from Moravská Třebová